William A. Mayer (1922-1994) was an American polo player and car dealer.

Biography
Mayer was a "nine-goal" rated polo player.  He won the U.S. Open Polo Championship in 1956 and 1959. He also won the Twenty-Goal Championship twice, as well as the Monty Waterbury Cup. He was inducted into the Museum of Polo and Hall of Fame in Lake Worth, Florida on March 3, 1995.

Following his polo playing career, Mayer served as president of Mayer Motors, an automobile dealership in Fort Lauderdale, Florida, from 1965 to 1974.

He had two sons, Robert M. Mayer and William A. Mayer Jr.

References

Sportspeople from Chicago
20th-century American businesspeople
American polo players
1922 births
1994 deaths